The 1908–09 Seton Hall Pirates men's basketball team represented Seton Hall University during the 1908–09 college men's basketball season. The head coach was William Caffrey, coaching his first season with the Pirates.

Schedule

|-

References

Seton Hall Pirates men's basketball seasons
Seton Hall
Seton Hall
Seton Hall